Five grains, traditional set phrase for lists or groupings which may contain non-grain crops. Particular instances of Five grains of a single crop or other substance such as minerals and metals have historical or cultural significance as well.

Five grains may refer to:

East Asia

 Five Cereals (China), various lists of the most important cultivated crops assigned since the earliest mythological times in Chinese cuisine, farming, and civil and spiritual culture
 Baijiu liquor, whose varieties include Five Grains Liquid (Wuliangye, 五 粮 液)
 Korean cuisine (section Grains), in whose myths deities brought seeds of five grains
 Ogokbap, five-grains rice in Korean cuisine
 A group of crops in Japanese cuisine and spiritual culture whose guardian is Ukanomitama no kami, a spirit to whom Kasama Inari Shrine is dedicated, and which are honored with a Five Grains Garden in Manyo Botanical Garden, Nara

West Asia
 Five species of grain can become chametz and matzo in Judaism.

Europe
 Five grains of incense are used in the course of Christian religious Dedication, (section Medieval Western customs) of altars and sacred places, as with Exsultet Easter Proclamation and the use of the Paschal candle

Atlantic
 "Five grains of corn," the daily ration of starving settlers from Europe traveling by ship in search of New World settlement, a tradition of Christian Thanksgiving lore

Mesoamerica
 In the Mayan board game Bul, if 5 tossed corn kernels marked on one side came up blank, the count was 5
 In the Mexica Aztec board game Patolli, 5 dimpled beans or stones were used like dice

Chemistry
 Using Grain (unit), a 325mg tablet of aspirin is sometimes referred to as "five grain aspirin."
 "Five grains of gold" are used in such European formulae as that for the gilding of buttons, where they are used in an amalgam of mercury
 The chemical specification of Coyoteite, NaFe3S5·2H2O, which was performed by electron microprobing of five grains of this mineral

References

Cereals